A Cape foot is a unit of length defined as 1.0330 English feet (and equal to 12.396 English inches, or 0.31485557516 meters) found in documents of belts and diagrams relating to landed property.  It was identically equal to the Rijnland voet and was introduced into South Africa by the Dutch settlers in the seventeenth and eighteenth century.
Its relationship to the English foot was clarified in 1859 by an Act of the government of the Cape Colony, South Africa.  It was used for land surveying and title deeds in rural areas of South Africa apart from Natal and was also for urban surveying and title deeds in the Transvaal. There were 144 square Cape feet in one Cape rood and 600 Cape roods (86,400 square Cape feet) in one morgen.

Its use ceased when South Africa adopted the metric system in 1977, though it has not yet been entirely replaced in pre-existing title deeds.

References

Units of measurement